MNR may stand for:

Transportation 
Maine Northern Railway
Metro-North Railroad in New York State
Mid-Norfolk Railway, a heritage railway in Norfolk, England
Manx Northern Railway, a railway on the Isle of Man from 1879 to 1905
Manor Road railway station, Wirral, England

Manufacturing 
Marc Nordon Racing, a manufacturer of Kit Cars in the UK

Political movements 
, a political party in France 
, a Belgian resistance group
, a political party in Bolivia
, a progressive political party in Guatemala

Other uses 

Marine Nature Reserve, a UK conservation designation
McMaster Nuclear Reactor, a nuclear reactor in Canada
Ministry of Natural Resources (Ontario), a government agency in Canada
Minister of National Revenue (Canada), minister in charge of taxation